Laguépie is a railway station in Laguépie, Occitanie, France. The station is on the Brive–Toulouse (via Capdenac) railway line. The station is served by TER (local) services operated by SNCF.

Train services
The following services currently call at Laguépie:
local service (TER Occitanie) Toulouse–Figeac–Aurillac

References

Railway stations in Tarn-et-Garonne